Eucalyptus stellulata, commonly known as black sallee or black sally, is a species of small tree or a mallee that is endemic to higher altitude regions of south-eastern Australia. it has rough bark on the lower part of the trunk smooth greenish bark above, lance-shaped to elliptical leaves, flower buds in group of between nine and fifteen, white flowers and cup-shaped or shortened spherical fruit.

Description
It has rough, shortly fibrous greyish bark on the lower trunk, smooth olive green bark that is somewhat oily above. The leaf veins are almost parallel. Flowering occurs between February and May and the flowers are white.

Taxonomy and naming
Eucalyptus stellulata  was first formally described in 1828 by the Swiss botanist Augustin Pyramus de Candolle in his book Prodromus Systematis Naturalis Regni Vegetabilis. The specific epithet (stellulata) is derived from a Latin word meaning "little star" and refers to the appearance of the clustered flower buds.

The Australian Oxford Dictionary gives the origin of "sally" and "sallee" as British dialect variants of "sallow", meaning "a willow tree, especially one of a low-growing or shrubby kind".

The Wiradjuri people of New South Wales use the name guulany for the species.

Distribution and habitat
Black sallee occurs from near Tenterfield in New South Wales and southwards along the Great Dividing Range to the eastern highlands of Victoria. It is a common plant in grassy eucalyptus woodland, often near swamps and by streams. The soils are usually of a relatively good fertility.

Gallery

References 

stellulata
Myrtales of Australia
Flora of New South Wales
Flora of Victoria (Australia)
Flora of the Australian Capital Territory
Plants described in 1828